The men's singles event at the 2009 Aegon International tennis tournament was won by Dmitry Tursunov.

Seeds

Draw

Finals

Top half

Bottom half

External links
Main Singles draw
Qualifying draw

Aegon International - Men's Singles
Singles